Elephant Shoe is the third studio album by Scottish indie rock band Arab Strap, released on 13 September 1999 by Go! Beat.

The album's title is a phrase sometimes used by children who are afraid of saying "I love you", where they mouth "I love you" under their breath, but when asked what they had said, answer "elephant shoe" or elephant juice, because the mouth shapes are the same.

Track listing

Charts

References

External links
 Official Arab Strap discography

Arab Strap (band) albums
1999 albums